Ben Williams (born 10 August 2002) is a Welsh rugby union player who plays for the Scarlets as a number 8. He is a Wales under-20 international.

Professional career 
Williams started playing for Gilfach Goch RFC as a youth player. Williams was not initially part of any regional academy, but earned a development contract with Aberavon RFC. In 2022, he joined the Ospreys academy, but joined the Scarlets academy in 2022. Williams also plays for Llanelli RFC, and has captained the side in the Indigo Premiership.

In 2022, Williams was selected for Wales U20 for the 2022 U20 Six Nations Summer Series, making three appearances.

On 18 February 2023, Williams made his debut for the Scarlets, coming on in the second half in the 42–14 win over Edinburgh. On 10 March 2023, Williams made his first start, playing as an openside flanker in a friendly against the Saracens.

References

External links 

 Scarlets profile
 Wales profile

2002 births
Living people
Scarlets players
Llanelli RFC players
Welsh rugby union players
Rugby union number eights
Aberavon RFC players